Bicurgium  (Βικούργιον)  is a German town mentioned in Ptolemy's Geography (2, 11, 14) in the year 150. The place, which according to Ptolemy lay in the interior of Germania, has not yet been positively identified. For example  Bickenriede near Mühlhausen on the Unstrut or the Celtic fortress of Steinsburg near Römhild have been suggested as the site of Bicurgium. An interdisciplinary research team led by Andreas Kleineberg, which re-examined the information provided by Ptolemy, locates the place by mathematical calculations in the area of today's Jena in Thuringia.

References

Archaeological sites in Germany
History of Thuringia